Dynomenidae is a family of crabs in the superfamily Dromioidea mostly found in Madagascar. There are nineteen genera in this family: five extant and fourteen known from fossils:

Acanthodromia A. Milne-Edwards, 1880
Dynomene Desmarest, 1823
Hirsutodynomene McLay, 1999
Metadynomene McLay, 1999
Paradynomene Sakai, 1963
†Acanthodiaulax Schweitzer et al., 2003
†Basinotopus M'Coy, 1849
†Cyamocarcinus Bittner, 1883
†Dromiopsis Reuss, 1858
†Dynomenopsis Secretan, 1972
†Eotrachynotocarcinus Beschin et al., 2007
†Gemmellarocarcinus Checchia-Rispoli, 1905
†Graptocarcinus Roemer, 1887
†Kierionopsis Davidson, 1966
†Maurimia Martins-Neto, 2001
†Ovamene Müller & Collins, 1991
†Stephanometopon Bosquet, 1854
†Trechmannius Collins & Donovan, 2006
†Xandaros Bishop, 1988

References

Further reading

External links 

 
 

Dromiacea
Decapod families